Fatorpa is a village in Quepem taluk, South Goa, Goa. There are two famous temples of Shree Shantadurga in this Village.

Geography
It is located at an elevation of 147 m above MSL.

Location
Nearest Mail/Express Trains main railway station is at Margao.
Nearest Passenger/Shuttle/Local Trains railway station is at Bali.

Places of interest
 Shri Shantadurga Temple
 Shri Mahamaya Temple

References

External links
 Satellite map of Fatorpa
 About Fatorpa

Villages in South Goa district